Ghurnijhar 1991 Padak (Bengali: ঘূর্ণিঝড় ১৯৯১ পদক), is a military medal of Bangladesh. The medal was established in 1991. The medal is intended for awarding servicemen who took part in the liquidation of the consequences of cyclone of 1991.

References 

Military awards and decorations of Bangladesh